Qingxin District, formerly Qingxin County, is a district of Qingyuan City, in northwest-central Guangdong province, China. In Mandarin Chinese, the name literally translates to "Fresh and Clean".

Qingxin is the location of Taihe Ancient Caves, a local tourist attraction.

County-level divisions of Guangdong
Qingyuan